The Johann-Peter-Hebel-Preis was endowed in 1936 in honour of the writer and dialectal poet Johann Peter Hebel. The prize is since 1974 awarded every two years (before every year) to writers, translators, essayists, media representatives or scientists from the German district Baden-Württemberg, who write in the Alemannic dialect or are connected with Hebel. The ceremony of the €10,000 prize takes place in Hausen im Wiesental, which is also home to the "Hebelfest" every 10 May. The municipality of Hausen also award every year the Johann-Peter-Hebel-Gedenkplakette to personalities from the Ober Rhein region.

Winners

 1936 Hermann Burte
 1937 Alfred Huggenberger
 1938 Eduard Reinacher
 1939 Hermann Eris Busse
 1940 Benno Rüttenauer
 1941 Emil Strauß
 1942 Wilhelm Weigand
 1943 Jakob Schaffner
 1946 Anton Fendrich
 1947 Franz Schneller
 1948 Traugott Meyer
 1949 Wilhelm Hausenstein
 1950 Wilhelm Altwegg
 1951 Albert Schweitzer
 1952 Max Picard
 1953 Reinhold Zumtobel
 1954 Otto Flake
 1955 Wilhelm Zentner
 1956 Lina Kromer
 1957 Emanuel Stickelberger
 1958 Friedrich-Alfred Schmid-Noer
 1959 Carl Jacob Burckhardt
 1960 Martin Heidegger
 1961 Albin Fringeli
 1962 Richard Nutzinger
 1963 Robert Minder
 1964 Adalbert Bächtold
 1965 Adalbert Welte
 1966 Eberhard Meckel
 1967 Josef Lefftz
 1968 Hermann Schneider
 1969 Gertrud Fussenegger
 1970 Marie Luise Kaschnitz
 1971 Lucien Sittler
 1972 Kurt Marti
 1973 Joseph Hermann Kopf
 1974 Gerhard Jung
 1976 André Weckmann
 1978 Erika Burkart
 1980 Elias Canetti
 1982 Maria Menz
 1984 Claude Vigée
 1986 Peter Bichsel
 1988 Michael Köhlmeier
 1990 Manfred Bosch
 1992 Adrien Finck
 1994 Peter von Matt
 1996 Kundeyt Surdum
 1998 Lotte Paepcke
 2000 Emma Guntz
 2002 Markus Werner
 2004 Maria Beig
 2006 Martin Stadler
 2008 Arno Geiger
 2010 Arnold Stadler
 2012 Karl-Heinz Ott
 2014 Franz Hohler
 2016 Lukas Bärfuss
 2018 Christoph Meckel
 2020 Sibylle Berg
 2022 Monika Helfer

References

External links
 

Literary awards of Baden-Württemberg